A minister plenipotentiary represents the government of one of the Caribbean constituent countries as part of the Kingdom of the Netherlands. The minister is part of the government of that country, but resides in the Netherlands, where they are part of the Council of Ministers of the Kingdom of the Netherlands.

Description
A significant difference between the Netherlands ministers and the ministers plenipotentiary is that the former ministers are accountable for their politics and policies to the Dutch parliament. The ministers plenipotentiary, however, are accountable to their national governments. Therefore, the ministers plenipotentiary usually do not resign in the event of a Dutch cabinet crisis.

Ministers plenipotentiary
The following three ministers plenipotentiary currently exist:
Minister Plenipotentiary of Aruba (est. 1986)
Minister Plenipotentiary of Curaçao (est. 2010)
Minister Plenipotentiary of Sint Maarten (est. 2010)

In addition ministers plenipotentiary have existed for the former Caribbean Netherlands Antilles (1954−2010) before its dissolution; and for the former South American colony of Suriname (1667–1954) before its independence 
Minister Plenipotentiary of the Netherlands Antilles (1954–2010)
Minister Plenipotentiary of Suriname (1954–1975)

References

Government in the Dutch Caribbean
Dutch political institutions